Isabelle Vengerova (7 February 1956) was a Russian, later American, pianist and music teacher.

She was born Izabella Afanasyevna Vengerova (Изабелла Афанасьевна Венгерова) in Minsk (now in Belarus) in the family of Pauline Vengerova and her husband Chonon. Her elder brother Semyon Vengerov was a venerable literary historian. She studied the piano at the Vienna Conservatory with Josef Dachs, and privately with Theodor Leschetizky; in Saint Petersburg she studied with Anna Yesipova. In Vienna she was a good friend of Arthur Schnitzler. From 1906 to 1920 she taught at the Imperial Conservatory in St Petersburg and then toured the USSR and Western Europe from 1920 to 1923, when she settled in the USA. While still in St. Petersburg in 1910, she recorded three pieces on Welte-Mignon player piano music rolls.

In 1924 she helped found the Curtis Institute and in 1933 joined the faculty of the Mannes College, teaching at both institutions until her death in New York City in 1956. She made her debut with the Detroit Symphony Orchestra in 1925. Vengerova was also known for her painstaking attention to detail and for a psychological insight that brought out the best in each pupil. While she denied having a particular method, she drilled all students in techniques designed to achieve expressive playing and beautiful tone, keeping the fingers close to the keys for evenness and a seamless legato; playing deeply in the keys while using the weight of the forearm and a flexible wrist to achieve a full singing tone without harshness, and controlling tone by higher or lower positions of the wrist.

Among her pupils were Blanche Abram, Stanley Babin, Samuel Barber, Ralph Berkowitz, Leonard Bernstein, Anthony di Bonaventura, Lukas Foss, Gary Graffman, Lilian Kallir, Gilbert Kalish, Jacob Lateiner, Julien Musafia, Leonard Pennario, Menahem Pressler, Carl Schachter, Abbey Simon, Dimitri Tiomkin, Ronald Turini, Leon Whitesell, and Sylvia Zaremba.

Isabelle was the sister of Zinaida Vengerova, a noted literary critic, and Semyon, a literary and intellectual historian. She was the maternal aunt and first teacher of Nicolas Slonimsky, who reports in his autobiography Perfect Pitch that as a young girl his aunt was kissed on the forehead by Johannes Brahms.

References 

 R. Gerig. Famous Pianists and their Technique (Washington DC, 1974)
 G. Graffman. I Really should be Practicing (New York, 1981)
 R.D. Schick. The Vengerova System of Piano Playing (University Park, PA, 1982)
 J. Rezits. Beloved Tyranna: the Legend and Legacy of Isabelle Vengerova (Bloomington, IN, 1995)

1877 births
1956 deaths
Musicians from Minsk
People from Minsky Uyezd
Belarusian Jews
Soviet emigrants to the United States
American people of Belarusian-Jewish descent
Jewish classical pianists
Russian classical pianists
Russian women pianists
American classical pianists
American women classical pianists
Women music educators
Pupils of Theodor Leschetizky
Academic staff of Saint Petersburg Conservatory
American women academics